"Meadowlands" is the fourth episode of the HBO original series The Sopranos. It was written by Jason Cahill, directed by John Patterson and originally aired on January 31, 1999.

Starring
 James Gandolfini as Tony Soprano
 Lorraine Bracco as Dr. Jennifer Melfi
 Edie Falco as Carmela Soprano
 Michael Imperioli as Christopher Moltisanti
 Dominic Chianese as Corrado Soprano, Jr.
 Vincent Pastore as Pussy Bonpensiero
 Steven Van Zandt as Silvio Dante
 Tony Sirico as Paulie Gualtieri
 Robert Iler as Anthony Soprano, Jr.
 Jamie-Lynn Sigler as Meadow Soprano
 Nancy Marchand as Livia Soprano

Guest starring
 John Heard as Vin Makazian
 Jerry Adler as Hesh Rabkin
 Michael Rispoli as Jackie Aprile, Sr.
 Mark Blum as Randall Curtin

Also guest starring

Synopsis
Tony becomes increasingly paranoid over his sessions with Dr. Melfi, especially after seeing Silvio leaving a dentist's office opposite Melfi's suite. He is also becoming attracted to Melfi and has corrupt police detective Vin Makazian secretly follow her. Makazian, who owes Tony money from gambling, assumes Melfi is Tony's mistress. When he sees her with a date he pulls the pair over, then assaults and arrests the man. Tony is beginning to consider quitting therapy, but Carmela—under the impression that Tony's therapist is a male—insists he continue or risk their marriage.

Christopher is scared after his mock execution leaves him in a neck brace. He becomes more unnerved when he and Adriana discover Brendan's body. Assuming that Tony is punishing him for giving speed to Meadow, he angrily confronts her but she assures him she has not told anyone. After finding that Junior and Mikey are responsible, Chris is inflamed and wants revenge. Tony orders Chris to stand down because Mikey is a made man, but then assaults Mikey himself. Tony then confronts Junior, who rejects an offer of compromise and tells him he should "come heavy" (i.e. with a gun) for his next visit or not at all.

The prospect of war with Junior looms large for Tony, especially after Jackie, the DiMeo family's acting boss, dies without a clear successor. Tony has the backing of other DiMeo capos, but seeks a diplomatic resolution with his uncle. After some unwitting inspiration from Melfi about giving the elderly the "illusion of control", Tony cedes leadership of the family to Junior in exchange for his uncle's income-earning properties and contracts, so war within the family is avoided while Junior becomes the primary target for federal investigations. Content with his decision, Tony opts to remain in therapy.

A.J. scuffles with a physically bigger classmate, Jeremy Piocosta. Jeremy backs down from a second formal fight and pays A.J. compensation for a shirt that was torn in the scuffle. A.J. is baffled by this. Meadow explains that Jeremy was not intimidated by A.J. but by Tony's reputation as a mobster. Tony had coincidentally run into Jeremy's father the day before at a plant nursery; Tony was friendly but happened to be holding an ax, and Jeremy's father quickly backed away. Meadow asks A.J. how many other garbage men live in a house as expensive as theirs, and shows him a Mafia-themed website. At Jackie's funeral, Meadow gives A.J. a knowing look and nods in the direction of the federal agents taking pictures.

First appearances
Vin Makazian: A corrupt detective in the Essex County police force whom Tony employs. 
Larry Boy Barese, Jimmy Altieri, Ray Curto: Capos in the DiMeo crime family who all have a "Captain's Dinner" with Tony and later attend the funeral.

Deceased
Jackie Aprile, Sr: Stomach cancer

Title reference
The Meadowlands is a wetlands area in northern New Jersey. Christopher identifies it as the place where his mock execution took place.

Cultural references
 At the beginning of the episode, A.J. is playing Mario Kart 64. When Tony comes home, he plays the game with him in multiplayer mode.
 Pussy refers to Brendan's murder, being shot through the eye, as a "Moe Greene special", in reference to the way Moe Greene is killed in the 1972 film The Godfather directed by Francis Ford Coppola.
 Christopher does the "say hello to my little friend" impression of Tony Montana from Scarface when expressing the want for revenge against Junior for the Brendan hit.
 Jimmy Altieri tells the capos their crime family should be run as a paramilitary organization and not as The Dave Clark Five when Larry Boy suggests a ruling council.
 Melfi's date Randall mentions the song "People Are Strange" by The Doors, but misquotes the lyric "Faces look ugly when you're alone," (Randall states, "Faces look evil when you're alienated.").
 When Tony congratulates Junior on becoming the boss, he commends Junior's physique and states "Hey call Parcells, give this guy a tryout".

Reception
Retrospectively, Emily St. James of The A.V. Club felt that although many elements of "Meadowlands" worked, the episode is "a bit of a step down from the previous three." She criticized the subplot involving AJ as "pretty pointless, playing out as a sort of miniature version of the Tony and Junior conflict and ending much the same way", but considered the overall episode to be "a pretty good summation of many of the things the show is going to be interested in going forward." Alan Sepinwall was highly positive, calling the resolution of the Tony and Junior conflict "an elegant solution, [...] and a great indicator of what a savvy tactician Tony is". Sepinwall also praised the final scene of "Meadowlands" as "a strong way to end an episode that's been all about the crumbling walls between Tony's work and home lives."

Music
 The song played when Tony visits Uncle Junior at the restaurant and tries to head off a war, but Junior threatens to take Christopher's business away is "Prisoner of Love" by Perry Como.
 The song played at the Bada Bing when Tony and the other captains eat lobsters and discuss the possibility of an impending war is "Ugly Stadium" by Tipsy. 
 The song played at the Bada Bing before the news announcement of Jackie Aprile's death is "Floor-Essence" by Man With No Name.
 The song played when A.J. watches Tony at Jackie's funeral and into the end credits is "Look on Down From the Bridge" by Mazzy Star.

Locations
In order of first appearance:

 New Bridge Medical Center in Paramus, New Jersey
 Tappan Zee High School in Orangeburg, New York
West Orange, New Jersey
 Jersey City, New Jersey
 Belleville Turnpike Bridge
 Satin Dolls in Lodi, New Jersey
Paramus, New Jersey
 Jersey City and Harsimus Cemetery

Awards
Jason Cahill won a Writers Guild of America award for his work on this episode.

References

External links
"Meadowlands"  at HBO

The Sopranos (season 1) episodes
1999 American television episodes
Television episodes about funerals
Television episodes directed by John Patterson (director)